Nar Williams is an American film, television, and new media writer and director.

Early life

Williams was born and raised in Cincinnati, Ohio. He earned a degree in theatre from Ohio State University. He lives in Los Angeles.

Career

Williams was a writer and host of the television series Science of the Movies, which aired on the Science Channel, and is a production of Discovery Communications. He also story produced the television mini-series Alien Encounters for Science Channel. He has appeared as a film critic on Current TV's The Rotten Tomatoes Show and as a guest host on G4's Attack of the Show! Williams is listed by Wired.com as one of the "Top 150 Geeky Media People on Twitter".

Williams, whilst hosting the TV series "Science of the Movies" talked profusely about achieving "nerdvana" [a state at which science fiction and fantasy fans reach the ultimate state of their fandom of the genres.] "Nerdvana" was also the name of Williams' podcast and daily blog.

Played the Pizza Delivery Guy in "Man of the House" (2005)

Williams wrote and produced the movie news/comedy show NextMovie Daily for MTV Networks. He also produced The Yahoo Movie Show and TV in No Time for Yahoo, and CraveOnline's comedy web series Heads Up, which showcased movies, video games, and comic books through commentary and sketch comedy. Heads Up was honored in the Variety Show category by the 14th Annual Webby Awards.

Williams wrote and directed Fanboy Funhouse, a comedy series that followed the antics of an odd cast of characters including Saug, a dragon with a dark past; Lobie, a talking brain in a jar; Dugnot, a bitter alien janitor; and Nar, the resident fanboy. In an interview with Tubefilter, Williams said of Fanboy Funhouse: “Shows like The Mighty Boosh and Pee-wee's Playhouse are a big inspiration for me. There’s no shortage of geek culture news on the internet, so my goal was to present it in a wild and unpredictable way -– with a cast of crazy characters. And I’m pretty sure it’s the only talk show with a playground slide for the guests.” The show was nominated for "Best Variety Show" by The International Academy of Web Television in 2012.

References

External links
Nar Williams on Twitter
Official website of Nar Williams

1979 births
Living people
American directors
Ohio State University College of Arts and Sciences alumni